The Corporation of Gloucester was the local government of the city of Gloucester in England before the creation of Gloucester City Council.

The records of the corporation were collated by William Henry Stevenson (1853-1924) in his Calendar of the Records of the Corporation of Gloucester.

See also
Gloucester Corporation Tramways

References

External links 
https://archive.org/details/calendarofrecor00glou/page/n9

Politics of Gloucester
Former local authorities of England